Republic First Bancorp, doing business as Republic Bank, is a Philadelphia-based bank founded in 1988. In 2008, the bank shifted from commercial banking to retail banking. In 2016, the bank named Commerce Bank founder Vernon Hill as chairman.

As of July 2016, Republic Bank operated 20 locations in Pennsylvania and New Jersey.

References

1988 establishments in Pennsylvania

Banks based in Philadelphia